Şırnak District is the central district of the Şırnak Province of Turkey and encompasses the main provincial city of Şırnak. In 2021, the district had a population of 100,206.

Settlements 
Şırnak District contains three beldes, thirty-eight villages of which nineteen are unpopulated and fifty-nine hamlets.

Beldes 

 Balveren
 Kasrik
 Kumçatı

Villages 

 Akçay
 Alkemer
 Anılmış
 Araköy
 Atbaşı
 Bağpınar
 Başağaç
 Boyunkaya
 Cevizdüzü
 Çadırlı
 Çakırsöğüt
 Dağkonak
 Dereler
 Geçitboyu
 Görmeç
 Güleşli
 Günedoğmuş
 Güneyce
 Güneyçam
 İkizce
 İnceler
 Kapanlı
 Karageçit
 Kavuncu
 Kayaboyun
 Kemerli
 Kırkkuyu
 Kızılsu
 Koçağılı
 Koçbeyi
 Körüklükaya
 Kuşkonar
 Seslice
 Tekçınar
 Toptepe
 Üçkıraz
 Yeniaslanbaşar
 Yoğurtçular

See also 

 Kuşkonar and Koçağılı massacre

References 

Districts of Şırnak Province
States and territories established in 1990